Ziebach County is a county in the U.S. state of South Dakota. As of the 2020 census, the population was 2,413. Its county seat is Dupree. It is the last county (or county equivalent) in the United States alphabetically.

The county's per-capita income makes it the fourth-poorest county in the United States.

History
A county named Ziebach was created in Dakota Territory in 1877. However, after South Dakota became a state, this county was dissolved in 1898 and its areas absorbed by Pennington and Stanley counties. The present Ziebach County was created by the SD Legislature on February 1, 1911, and was fully organized by April 22. The 1911 Ziebach County encompassed parts of the former counties of Schnasse, Armstrong and Sterling, which were the last three extinct counties of South Dakota to cease to exist. It was named for Frank M. Ziebach, a political figure in the Dakota Territory during the territorial period from 1861 to 1889. Previously the area had been used by trappers and in 1907 part was briefly a reservation for Ute Indians displaced from Utah and Wyoming. Early in the 20th Century cattle were raised in substantial numbers, but when the railroad bypassed the area this industry declined. Limited homesteading also occurred on the more fertile lands.

Geography
The Cheyenne River flows east-northeastward along the southern boundary of Ziebach County. The Moreau River flows eastward through the upper portion of the county, and Cherry Creek flows southeastward through the lower portion, draining the area into the Cheyenne River. The terrain is composed of semi-arid rolling hills interrupted by buttes and carved by drainages and gullies, partly devoted to agriculture and cattle. The terrain slopes to the south and the east; its highest point (except for the isolated Thunder Butte, at 2,733') is near its NW corner at 2,582' (787m) ASL. Almost the entire county lies within the Cheyenne River Indian Reservation. The balance of the county, along its extreme northern county line, lies within the Standing Rock Indian Reservation. It is one of five South Dakota counties that lie entirely on Indian reservations.

Buttes
Ziebach County is part of the Great Plains and is characterized by rolling grasslands and numerous buttes. The buttes form the highest points of elevation in Ziebach County:

 Bessie Butte 2,474 feet (754.08 m)
 Eagle Butte 2,484 feet (757.12 m)
 Gray Butte 2,316 feet (705.92 m)
 High Elk Hill 2,395 feet (730.00 m)
 Joshua Butte 2,165 feet (659.89 m)
 Marple Butte 2,484 feet (757.12 m)
 Mud Butte 2,500 feet (762.00 m)
 Mud Butte 2,365 feet (720.85 m)
 Rattlesnake Butte 2,411 feet (734.87 m)
 Saint Patrick Butte 2,356 feet (718.11 m)
 Squaw Teat Butte 2,365 feet (720.85 m)
 Thunder Butte 2,733 feet (833.02 m)

Major highways

  U.S. Highway 212
  South Dakota Highway 20
  South Dakota Highway 34
  South Dakota Highway 63
  South Dakota Highway 65
  South Dakota Highway 73

Adjacent counties

 Corson County - north
 Dewey County - east
 Stanley County - southeast
 Haakon County - south
 Pennington County - southwest
 Meade County - west
 Perkins County - northwest

Protected areas
 Bednor Lake State Game Production Area
 Cheyenne State Game Production Area (part)
 Grand River National Grassland (part)

Lakes and reservoirs
 Bedners Dam
 K C Dam
 Rattlesnake Lake

Demographics

2000 census
As of the 2000 United States Census, there were 2,519 people, 741 households, and 594 families in the county. The population density was 1.3 people per square mile (0.5/km2). There were 879 housing units at an average density of 0.4 per square mile (0.2/km2). The racial makeup of the county was 72.29% Native American, 26.40% White, 0.08% Asian, 0.12% from other races, and 1.11% from two or more races. 0.99% of the population were Hispanic or Latino of any race.

There were 741 households, out of which 47.2% had children under the age of 18 living with them, 47.9% were married couples living together, 23.8% had a female householder with no husband present, and 19.8% were non-families. 17.4% of all households were made up of individuals, and 5.1% had someone living alone who was 65 years of age or older. The average household size was 3.40 and the average family size was 3.81.

The county population contained 40.6% under the age of 18, 10.8% from 18 to 24, 24.7% from 25 to 44, 16.5% from 45 to 64, and 7.5% who were 65 years of age or older. The median age was 24 years. For every 100 females there were 97.0 males. For every 100 females age 18 and over, there were 98.1 males.

The median income for a household in the county was $18,063, and the median income for a family was $18,672. Males had a median income of $19,038 versus $21,167 for females. The per capita income for the county was $7,463. About 45.20% of families and 49.90% of the population were below the poverty line, including 61.10% of those under age 18 and 27.20% of those age 65 or over.  In 2009, it was one of 17 counties in the United States where half of all children live in poverty.

2010 census
As of the 2010 United States Census, there were 2,801 people, 836 households, and 638 families in the county. The racial makeup of the county was 74.9% American Indian, 21.8% white, 0.2% black or African American, 0.1% Asian, 0.1% from other races, and 3.0% from two or more races. Those of Hispanic or Latino origin made up 3.1% of the population.

Of the 836 households, 53.7% had children under the age of 18 living with them, 39.0% were married couples living together, 29.3% had a female householder with no husband present, 23.7% were non-families, and 20.9% of all households were made up of individuals. The average household size was 3.35 and the average family size was 3.82. The median age was 25.4 years.

The median income for a household in the county was $27,578 and the median income for a family was $22,857. Males had a median income of $28,954 versus $24,327 for females. The per capita income for the county was $11,069. About 41.9% of families and 46.0% of the population were below the poverty line, including 56.1% of those under age 18 and 22.9% of those age 65 or over.

Communities

Cities
 Dupree (county seat)
 Eagle Butte (partial)

Census-designated places 

 Bridger

 Cherry Creek

Unincorporated communities

 Chase
 Glad Valley
 Iron Lightning
 Red Elm
 Red Scaffold
 Thunder Butte

Unorganized territories
Ziebach County government does not include subdivision into townships. The county is divided into three areas of unorganized territory: Dupree, North Ziebach, and South Ziebach.

Politics
Ziebach County has traditionally been a swing county. Only Ronald Reagan in 1980 and Barack Obama in 2008 have topped sixty percent for either major party in the past six decades. Donald Trump won 48% of the vote in 2016, being the county or equivalent he won with the highest percentage of Native Americans. Joe Biden won 53% of the vote in 2020.

See also
 National Register of Historic Places listings in Ziebach County, South Dakota

References

 
1911 establishments in South Dakota
Populated places established in 1911